The Black Spider is an 1842 novella by Jeremias Gotthelf.

The Black Spider may also refer to:

Fictional characters

DC
 Black Spider (Eric Needham), a DC Comics supervillain.
 Black Spider (Johnny LaMonica), a DC Comics supervillain.
 Black Spider (Derrick Coe), a DC Comics supervillain.

Marvel
 Black Spider-Man (Miles Morales), a Marvel Comics superhero.
 Black Spider-Man Costume, later known as a symbiote, a Marvel Comics alien species.
 Black Spider-Woman (Ashley Barton), a Marvel Comics supervillain.
 Black Spider-Woman (Jessica Drew), a Sony Pictures superheroine.

Films
 The Black Spider (1920 film), a British silent mystery film.
 The Black Spider (1921 film), a German silent horror film.

Music
 The Black Spider (opera), an opera by Judith Weir.
 "Black Spiderman", a 2017 rap song by the rapper Logic.
 The Black Spiders, an English rock band.

Other
 BlackSpider Technologies Limited, a British software company.
 Red-faced black spider monkey, a species of monkey.
 The Black spider memos, a series of letters and memorandums written by Charles III of the United Kingdom, during his tenure as Prince of Wales, to British government ministers and politicians over several years.